"I Would Know You Anywhere" is an Indian poem on the popular Hindu god Ganesha by the Indian English poet Revathy Gopal. The poem won Second Prize in the Ninth All India Poetry Competition conducted by The Poetry Society (India) in 2000. This was the second major literary award for Revathy, who had also won second prize in the eighth All India Poetry Competition.

Excerpts from the poem

I would know you anywhere
even as a line drawing,
with only a suggestion
of broken tusk.

A mischievous arc
of belly and trunk;
minimalist.

 *****

I know you in stone
and wood. Terracotta
is fine; once in someone’s
living room,
I saw you made in jade
with the light trapped inside.

 *****

In shops sometimes.
they seal you in plastic.
Even on a crowded, noisy street
you make
an area of stillness
around you.

 *****

I stand in a trance
watching the dance.
One leg lifted high,
or in the indolence
after sleep,
balancing your elephantine
head in your hand.

Renegade, clown, purveyor of dreams,
Dispeller of darkness, arbiter of destinies.
You stand just beyond
my angle of vision,
untamed, unclaimed.

Comments and criticism

The poem has received rave reviews since its first publication in 2000 in the book Emerging Voices. The poem has been frequently quoted in scholarly analysis of contemporary Indian English Poetry. The poem has become very popular in Indian English literature and has been widely anthologised.

Online references
  Ninth National Poetry Competition 2000 - Award Winners
  Sacred Songs - I Would Know You Anywhere by Revathy Gopal
  Revathy Gopal in Memoriam
  India Writes - Contemporary Indian Poetry

See also
Indian English Poetry
The Poetry Society (India)

Notes

Hindu poetry
Indian poems
2000 poems
Works originally published in Indian magazines
Works originally published in literary magazines